Arthrosporum is a genus of lichenized fungi in the family Ramalinaceae. It is monotypic, containing only the single species Arthrosporum acclinoides.

References

Ramalinaceae
Lichen genera
Lecanorales genera